Jacob Wayne Young (born September 10, 1979) is an American actor and producer. He is a five-time Daytime Emmy Award nominee, winning once in 2002 for his role as Lucky Spencer in the soap opera General Hospital (2000–2003). He is best known for his roles as Rick Forrester in the soap opera The Bold and the Beautiful (1997–1999, 2011–2018) and JR Chandler in the soap opera All My Children (2003–2011).

Early life and career
Jacob Wayne Young was born in Renton, Washington, the youngest child of Rhonda and Michael Young, Sr. and was raised in Loveland, Colorado, and Roy, Washington, moving to San Diego, California at age seventeen with his mother. His parents divorced and his mother remarried to Edward Vasquez. He has one older brother and two sisters.

Young portrayed Rick Forrester on the CBS soap The Bold and the Beautiful from December 31, 1997 to September 15, 1999. He was nominated for a Daytime Emmy Award as Outstanding Younger Actor in a Drama Series in 1999. Young later portrayed Lucky Spencer on General Hospital for three years from February 25, 2000 until February 10, 2003. In 2001, he was named "Sexiest Soap Star" by People magazine. In 2002, he won a Daytime Emmy Award for Outstanding Younger Actor in a Drama Series for his role as Lucky Spencer on General Hospital

Young portrayed JR Chandler on All My Children from October 1, 2003 to September 23, 2011. In 2005, he was again nominated for a Daytime Emmy Award as Outstanding Younger Actor, and in 2009 he was nominated for Outstanding Supporting Actor in a Drama Series.

In September 2011, Young reprised his role as Rick on The Bold and the Beautiful. His first airdate was September 26. In April 2018, Young announced he had been dropped to recurring capacity, which he called a "blessing."

Other projects
On September 11, 2001, Artemis Records released Young's self-titled CD. In 2004, he guest-starred in the film The Girl Next Door. He additionally guest-starred on ABC's Hope & Faith and, from May 2006 through August 20, 2006, starred in Disney's Beauty and the Beast on Broadway, in the role of Lumiere.

Personal life
In April 2006, Young and his longtime girlfriend, Christen Steward, a model, announced their engagement. They were married on May 13, 2007, at the Westmount Country Club in Woodland Park, New Jersey. The couple has three children.

Filmography

Awards and nominations

See also
JR Chandler and Babe Carey

References

External links
Jacob Young's official website

Jacob Young, Fresh Face: Broadway.com Buzz

1979 births
American male film actors
American male soap opera actors
American male television actors
Living people
Male actors from San Diego
People from Renton, Washington
People from Tillamook, Oregon
Daytime Emmy Award winners
Daytime Emmy Award for Outstanding Younger Actor in a Drama Series winners
Male actors from Washington (state)
People from Pierce County, Washington